Duniya Ek Sarai is a 1946 Hindi-language film. Meena Kumari, after her career as a child artist, started doing adult roles as heroines in mythologicals and fantasy genres before she made it in mainstream cinema with Baiju Bawra (1952).

Music 
"Ek Musaafir Aaye Bawa" – Mohammed Farooqui
"Dekh Hame Muskaye Kyo Balamwa Sajanwa" – Hamida Banu, Mukesh
"Ghat Par Ek Matka Ek Matki" – Shamshad Begum
"Aayi Baisakhi Bagiya Mehki" – Mohammed Farooqui
"Chanda Ki Chandni Na Suhaye To Kya Kare" – Shamshad Begum
"Cheen Li Hamari Hansi De Gaye Rona Humko" – Zohrabai Ambalewali, Meena Kumari
"Joban Pe Kyon Itraai Kali" -
"Ma Dekh Ri Ma Badli" – Meena Kumari
"Sawan Beet Gayo Mayi Ri" – Meena Kumari

References

External links 
 

1946 films
1940s Hindi-language films
Films scored by Hansraj Behl
Indian black-and-white films